F130 may refer to :

 Farman F.130, a 1920s French bomber
 Rolls-Royce F130, a high-bypass turbofan engine